Elizabeth Timothy or Elisabet Timothee  ( 1700 – April 1757) was a colonial American printer and newspaper publisher in the colony of South Carolina. Timothy was a French Huguenot Dutch immigrant who came to colonial America with her family. She was the first American woman to become a newspaper publisher and also the first to hold a franchise in America. Timothy reported on the 1740 Charleston fire that destroyed a major portion of the town. She published government documents and other materials for the colonial United States, and worked for Benjamin Franklin.

Early life 

Timothy (maiden name Elizabeth Villin or Elisabet Vilain) was born in the Netherlands about 1700. She received her formal schooling in her home town in Holland, which included accounting. She married Lewis Timothy (French: "Louys Timothee" or "Louis Timothee") early in the eighteenth century.

The Timothy family traveled with other French Huguenots in 1731 from Rotterdam to Philadelphia on the ocean liner Britannia of London. The Timothy family included four children ranging in age from one to six. Their sons were Peter, Louis and Charles, and their daughter was Mary.

Mid life 
Timothy's husband arranged with Benjamin Franklin to revive the South Carolina Gazette weekly newspaper on a six-year franchise contract, dated 26 November 1733. He went to Charleston, by himself initially, in the latter part of 1733.  He started publishing the newspaper on 2 February 1734. Timothy followed later from Philadelphia after she settled the family accounts, and went to Charleston in the spring of 1734. She came to Charleston with her six children, four of whom had been born in the Netherlands. Timothy's history of becoming a newspaper publisher in America is interwoven with her husband's career. 

Timothy's husband died on 30 December 1738 of yellow fever, referred to by the Timothy family as an unfortunate incident. The remaining term on the agreement with Franklin motivated Timothy to become his apprentice and partner. She carried on her late husband's work to fulfill the one year remaining on the Franklin franchise agreement. Timothy's elder son, Peter Timothy, carried on the newspaper business in name only. Peter was only fourteen years old when was named as taking over his father's printing business, which he was entitled to receive per the Franklin-Timothy agreement of 1733. Since he was just a child in 1738 and too immature to run a business, it was managed by Timothy, Peter's mother. She published the South-Carolina Gazette weekly starting on 4 January 1739. The masthead said that it was published and printed by Peter Timothy, but it actually was controlled and managed by his mother. She managed the business so successfully (with carefulness and integrity noted by Franklin) that one year later she purchased his interest to own it all herself. This then made her the first female editor and publisher of a newspaper in America.

Timothy, with the aid of Peter, increased the quality of the newspaper over the long term, in the views of the readers of the South-Carolina Gazette. Her newspaper was broad-based, with dramas, poetry, and literary classics. Timothy printed European news from London, Paris, and Constantinople. An important part of her newspaper, highly valued by many readers, was the advertisements. They offered local commodity goods as well as books and stationery supplies. Many times she dedicated at least a full page of her four-page newspaper to advertising.

Charleston fire 
Timothy's biggest news story was that of the fire in Charleston on 18 November 1740. She reported two days later that it had destroyed a major portion of the town, including the most valuable commercial buildings and their merchandise worth more than 200,000 pounds sterling. In her paper, it was reported that the wind carried sparks far set more houses. She credited the diligent citizens of Charleston for their great efforts to extinguish the fire. Her newspaper delivered a proclamation that citizens should render quick and efficient help in extinguishing future fires, and should give back stolen items. In subsequent newspaper issues she published business relocations with notices that their customers would be taken care of as usual. She also printed appeals for help in finding lost commodities and assets.

Franklin praised Timothy, saying she was a better business manager and accountant than her late husband had been. He remarked in his Autobiography that while her husband was an educated man and honest, he was ignorant in matters of accounting. He noted that in the Netherlands it was part of the female education to get trained in accounting. Additionally, Franklin commended her for having brought up honest and hard working children. Historian Isaiah Thomas suggests (as Franklin contemporaneously concurred) that her good business sense could be attributed to the high level of education she had acquired in the Netherlands.

Timothy took over her husband's position as the official public printer for the colony of South Carolina. She printed acts, laws, and events for the Assembly of the colony of South Carolina. In addition to printing the South-Carolina Gazette and government documents, as her late husband had, she printed sermons and religious materials. She also published some 20 historical books and pamphlets between 1739 and 1745. The description of "Printed by Peter Timothy" appeared on each of the publications; however, she made most of the business decisions. Timothy was also the postmaster for Charles Towne, South Carolina, delivering letters, packages, and newspapers.

Career change 
After adulthood, Timothy's son Peter took over the complete printing business on King Street in 1746, Timothy opened a bookstore next door. She carried books, stationery, and writing supplies, such as ink, powder, and quills. She also carried tallow, beer, and flour. In a Gazette advertisement of October 1746, she said she sold pocket Bibles, spellers, and primers. She also sold full books by well known authors and Franklin's works, including Poor Richard's Almanack. Timothy ran her bookstore and stationery shop for a year and then decided to leave Charleston. Prior to leaving, Timothy advertised in the South-Carolina Gazette that she was leaving the area and wished for people to pay up on debts owed her. She went to a new area for a time and later returned to Charleston in 1756.

Death and will 
Timothy wrote her will on 2 April 1757 and died within the month.

Her will stipulated that her widowed daughter Mary Elizabeth Bourquin was to receive a small piece of land, a house, two slaves, and a portion of Timothy’s clothing and furniture. Her married daughters Catherine Trezevant and Louisa Richards similarly receive property and slaves.

Personal life and legacy 
Timothy belonged to the Charles Towne Library Society, her son Peter being one of the founders. She and her family belonged to the St. Philip's Anglican Church in Charleston, South Carolina. Historians record that Timothy's husband was accidentally killed in December 1738. Timothy was pregnant with her seventh child (third American) in 1739, but the child was premature and died. She also lost two sons in 1739 to yellow fever. At the time of Timothy's death in 1757 she was survived by her son Peter, who had married Ann Donovan, and by her three daughters: Mary Elizabeth, married to Abraham Bowquin; Catherine, married to Theodore Trezevant; and Louisa, married to James Richards.

After her death, Timothy was inducted into both the South Carolina Press Association Hall of Fame (1973) and the South Carolina Business Hall of Fame (2000). A plaque is at the Vendue Range in Charleston describing her role in journalism. Timothy was the first known female in American journalism, according to historian A.S. Sallev. The fact that Timothy took over her husband's business of publishing the South-Carolina Gazette newspaper from a franchisee agreement he had with Franklin made her the first female franchisee in America as well.

Works 
The South Carolina Gazette newspaper below of 4 January 1739 is an example of a work attributed to Timothy. She also published colonial laws, bank notes, broadsides, and stationary and established a bookstore.  

Franklin reprinted many of Timothy's articles, as did the Gentlemen's Magazine in England. She continued to publish the Gazette newspaper for 19 years after her husband's death. Her son Peter inherited the business and ran the enterprise for many years.

See also 

 List of early American publishers and printers
 List of women printers and publishers before 1800
 Alexander Purdie (publisher)
 William Hunter (publisher)
 William Parks (publisher)
 Joseph Royle (publisher)
 Isaac Collins (printer)
 David Hall (publisher)
 John Holt (publisher)

References

Bibliography

External links 
 Elizabeth Timothy historical marker

18th-century American newspaper publishers (people)
American printers
American slave owners
South Carolina postmasters
Businesspeople from Charleston, South Carolina
1702 births
1757 deaths
Dutch emigrants to the Thirteen Colonies
South Carolina colonial people
Burials in South Carolina
18th-century American businesswomen
Colonial American women
American women journalists
History of women in the United States
Women printers
Colonial American printers